TPE may refer to:

Places
 Taipei (ISO 3166 code: TW-TPE), the capital of Taiwan
 "Chinese Taipei" (IOC and FIFA code: TPE), the name used in some international organizations and competitions for Taiwan

Science and Technology
 TPE (cable system), a submarine telecommunications cable
 Thermoplastic elastomer, a class of copolymers with both thermoplastic and elastomeric properties
 Transponder equivalent, a method of comparing communication satellite bandwidths
 Triphenylethylene, the parent compound of a group of selective estrogen receptor modulators
 Tree-structured Parzen Estimator, a sequential model-based optimization (SMBO) algorithm

Transport
 Tampines East MRT station (MRT station abbreviation: TPE), a Mass Rapid Transit station in Tampines, Singapore
 Taoyuan International Airport (IATA code: TPE), an airport serving Taipei and northern Taiwan
 TransPennine Express, a train operating company in the UK

Other uses
 Tampines Expressway, Singapore
 That Petrol Emotion, a Northern Irish/Anglo/American band
 Total Power Exchange